Vana-Sonda is a village in Lüganuse Parish, Ida-Viru County, in northeastern Estonia. It's located about 1.5 km east of Sonda. Vana-Sonda has a population of 15 (as of 1 January 2010)

Tallinn–Tapa–Narva goes through the heart of the village.

Vana-Sonda village was established on 29 November 2010 by separating the land from Varinurme village.

References

Villages in Ida-Viru County
Lüganuse Parish